Francis Drewe (c. 1674–1734), of the Grange, Broadhembury, Devon, was a British lawyer and Tory politician who sat in the House of Commons from 1713 to 1734.

Drewe was born at Lezant, the son of Rev. Edward Drewe, canon of Exeter, and his wife Joan Sparrow daughter  of Anthony Sparrow, Bishop of Exeter. He matriculated at Corpus Christi College, Oxford on 2 August 1690, aged 16, and entered  Middle Temple in 1691. In 1697 he was called to the bar. He married Mary Bidgood, daughter of Humphrey Bidgood of Rockbeare, near Exeter on 7 January 1695.

Drewe began his career as a barrister at Exeter. His father had political connections and influence and Drewe was returned unopposed as Member of Parliament for Exeter at the 1713 general election. His father died in 1714 and he succeeded to the Grange at Broadhembury.

Drewe was returned unopposed again at the 1715 general election, but faced a contest at the   1722 general election at which he was returned successfully.  He was appointed a bencher in 1723. At the 1727 general election he was returned unopposed again and he retired in 1734. In Parliament, he voted consistently against the Government.

Drewe died aged 60 on 13 September 1734. He and his wife had two sons and three daughters. His son Francis was High Sheriff of Devon in 1738.

See also
Drewe family of Broadhembury

References

1670s births
1734 deaths

Year of birth uncertain
People from Cornwall
Members of the Parliament of Great Britain for Exeter
British MPs 1713–1715
British MPs 1715–1722
British MPs 1722–1727
British MPs 1727–1734